Kazuo (カズオ, かずお) is a masculine Japanese given name.

Possible spellings
It has several written forms, and the meaning depends on the characters used (usually kanji, but sometimes hiragana). Common forms include:
 一雄: first son, first in leadership/excellence
 一夫: first son
 一男: first man/male
 和夫: harmonious/peaceful man
 和男: harmonious/peaceful man
 かずお (hiragana)
 カズオ (katakana)

People with the name
, Japanese sport wrestler
 Kazuo Aoki, Japanese government minister during the Second Sino-Japanese War, and into World War II
, Japanese shogi player
 Kazuo Chiba (born 1940), aikido
 Kazuo Harada (died 1998), anime producer, audio director, and sound effects director
 Kazuo Hirai (平井一夫, born 1964), President/CEO of Sony Computer
 Kazuo Endo, Kobe earthquake survivor
 Kazuo Hashimoto, late Japanese inventor of Caller ID and the telephone answering machine, including the ansafone.
, Japanese actor and voice actor
 Kazuo Hiramatsu (1947–2020), accounting scholar, president of Kwansei Gakuin University
 Kazuo Hirotsu (1891–1968), Japanese novelist and literary critic active in the Shōwa period of Japan
 Kazuo Ichinohe (born 1941), Japanese voice actor (stage name Shin Aomori)
, Japanese aikidoka
 Kazuo Inamori (born 1932), Japanese businessman
, Japanese cyclist
 Kazuo Ishiguro (石黒一雄, born 1954), British author
, Japanese table tennis player
, Japanese high jumper
 Kazuo Kitagawa (北側一雄, born 1953), Minister of Agriculture, Forestry and Fisheries in the Japanese Cabinet of Junichiro Koizumi
, Japanese diver
 Kazuo Koike (小池一夫, born 1936), manga artist
 Kazuo Komizu (born 1946), Japanese film director
 Kazuo Kubokawa (窪川一雄, 1903–1943), astronomer
, Japanese actor, voice actor and theatre director
, Japanese ice hockey player
 Kazuo Matsui (松井稼頭央, born 1975), baseball player
 Kazuo Misaki (born 1976), Japanese professional mixed martial arts fighter and former judoka
 Kazuo Miyagawa (宮川一夫, 1908–1999), cinematographer
 Kazuo Mizutani (水谷和夫), Chief of Staff of Japanese Imperial Guard during the close of World War II
Kazuo Nakamura (1926–2002), Japanese-Canadian painter and sculptor
, Japanese basketball coach
 Kazuo Nakanishi (1922–2003), briefly the leader of the Yamaguchi-gumi yakuza syndicate in the chaotic years of the Yama-Ichi War
, Japanese magazine editor and photography critic
, Japanese swimmer
 Kazuo Ohno (1906–2010), Japanese dancer associated with Butoh
 Kazuo Oka (born 1948), Japanese voice actor
, Japanese-American professional wrestler
, Japanese footballer
, Japanese footballer and manager
, Japanese racewalker
 Kazuo Sakamaki (酒巻和男, 1918–1999), first prisoner of war held by the US in World War II
 Kazuo Sakurada (1948–2020), known as Mr. Sakurada) retired Japanese professional wrestler
, Japanese cross-country skier
, Japanese footballer
, Japanese sport wrestler
, Japanese shogi player
, Japanese mixed martial artist
 Kazuo Taoka (田岡一雄, 1913–1981), Godfather of the Yamaguchi-gumi yakuza syndicate
 Kazuo Umezu (楳図かずお, born 1936), horror manga author
, Japanese businessman
 Kazuo Yamada (1912–1991), Japanese conductor
, Japanese sociologist

Fictional characters
 Kazuo Tengan, the antagonist of Danganronpa
 Kazuo Nakano, character in Yudetamago's manga series Kinnikuman
 Kazuo Saki, brother of the Shredder from the 1987–1996 animated TV series, Teenage Mutant Ninja Turtles
 Kazuo Uzuki, fictional baseball player that Topps created as an April Fools' Day hoax
 Kazuo Kiriyama, the primary antagonist of Battle Royale
 Kazuo Makunoichi, fictional character in Hajime no Ippo

Video games
 Kazuo or Go! Sudoku, is the name for the Japanese release of the PlayStation Portable puzzle game
 Kazuo Sawa is the name of a video game composer. Notable works include the soundtracks for The Battle of Olympus and Rivercity Ransom
 Kazuo Akuji is the leader of the Ronin in the Saints Row 2
 Kazuo Hoshiro is the leader of the Investigation Team of Sweet Home (video game)

References

Japanese masculine given names